Abhinandanam is a 1976 Indian Malayalam-language film,  directed by I. V. Sasi and produced by A. Raghunath. The film stars Jayabharathi, Vincent, KP Ummer, Bahadoor Prakash and Prema. The film has musical score by Kannur Rajan.

Cast

K. P. Ummer as Venu Menon
Jayabharathi as Geetha
M. G. Soman as Sreedharan
Vincent as Suku
Sridevi as Lalitha
Rani Chandra as Radha
Adoor Bhasi as Govindan
P. K. Abraham as Prabhakaran
Bahadoor as Vasu Pilla
Kuthiravattam Pappu as Alikutty
Alummoodan as Naanu ashan
Ravikumar as Ravi
Prema as Subadra
Meena as Saraswathy
Usharani as Vimala
Janardanan as Police Inspector
Sankaradi as Menon
M. O. Devasya as Kunjuvareed
Master Rajakrishnan as Damu
Prakash
Sankar Manankav
Prathapachandran
Treasa as Nabeesa

Soundtrack
The music was composed by Kannur Rajan and the lyrics were written by Sreekumaran Thampi.

References

External links
 

1976 films
1970s Malayalam-language films
Films directed by I. V. Sasi